The Head of the Donetsk People´s Republic is the highest office of the Donetsk People's Republic, an unrecognised republic of Russia in the occupied parts of eastern Ukraine's Donetsk Oblast.

List of Heads of the DPR

Timeline

References 

Politics of the Donetsk People's Republic
2014 establishments in Ukraine
Lists of heads of the federal subjects of Russia